North Cotswold Community Radio is a non-profit community internet radio station serving primarily the North Cotswolds and the surrounding area in west-central England.

The station began broadcasting in autumn 2007. Its launch in February 2007 was delayed by some months when the station lost its intended premises at Little Rissington Business Park, but new premises were found in the basement rooms of the Old Police Station in Chipping Campden. The station was supported by The Campden and District Peelers Trust, who offered the premises at the Old Police Station; the Cotswold Conservation Board, a body that oversees the Cotswolds Area of Outstanding Natural Beauty and supports social, environmental and economic projects that benefits the local area; the Gloucestershire Community Foundation, who provided funding after the basement rooms were flooded; the Chipping Campden Community Trust; and The Co-operative Bank. The station made a bid to become an FM community radio station but delays by Ofcom, the independent body that awards community radio licences, led to the station making a complaint to the parliamentary ombudsman in 2009.

A range of different programming is broadcast including news and sport shows, and music shows featuring unsigned artists that would not get airtime on mainstream radio. The show Backtrackin hosted by Richard Price has featured actor Chris Jury, talking about his career, and Matthew and Nicole Cutler, dancers on the BBC series Strictly Come Dancing, talking about their dance partnership. A women show, Girl's Talk, featuring topical discussion and guests was launched in autumn 2009. Peter Knight, member of the folk group Steeleye Span, appeared on The Unsigned Community show, talking about his projects.

In October 2012, it was announced that the chairman Robb Eden would step down from his post at the end of the year, due to the inability to get funding for community radio. He will remain as the station's president. At the November meeting of the management committee John Bowlt was elected as the new chairman of the station. John has been on the committee since 2007 with the responsibility for fundraising and has produced and presented a weekly programme "Cotswold Country" each Saturday from 12.00pm -2.00pm. John was involved in the music business as a drummer from the 60's until the 80's both professionally and part-time but gave up playing to concentrate on a business career in 1985.

He has over the years chaired British Standards Committees and represented the UK on worldwide committees and was the co founder and vice president of the European Sunglass association. He also set up and ran his own company for over ten years in the UK market before selling up and working as self-employed Sales and Marketing consultant worldwide.
John said on his appointment " Robb Eden will be a very difficult act to follow as chairman. He has been the main driving force behind the setting up and running of NCCR and everybody involved is aware that without his contribution,drive and determination the station would not be broadcasting. I look forward to working with him in the future in his role as President/station manager and to continue with the development of NCCR as a leading Community radio station"

References

External links
North Cotswold Community Radio

Community radio stations in the United Kingdom
Radio stations in Gloucestershire